Entanglement is a one-act chamber opera by the British composer Charlotte Bray and the librettist Amy Rosenthal.  The work was commissioned by the Nova Music Opera and was first performed on 6 July 2015 at the Cheltenham Music Festival, with the conductor George Vass leading soprano Kirsty Hopkins, baritone Howard Croft, tenor Greg Tassell, and the Nova Music Opera Ensemble.

Background
Bray described the inspiration for Entanglement in the score program notes, writing:

Composition
Entangled is written in a single act and has a duration of roughly 40 minutes.

Instrumentation
The work is scored for a soprano, tenor, and baritone, and a chamber ensemble comprising flute, clarinet, percussion, violin, cello, and double bass.

Roles

Reception
Reviewing the world premiere, Rian Evans of The Guardian praised the opera, writing, "Bray and Rosenthal are at pains to go deeper into Ellis's story than her defence team did at the time, emphasising her abusive relationship with the shallow Blakely (tenor Greg Tassell), her anger at being rejected by his friends, and the apparent complicity of a former lover, Desmond Cussen (baritone Howard Quilla Croft), whose gun was her weapon. The tangled question is reopened: was this a crime of passion or a cold-blooded murder? Kirsty Hopkins commanded attention as the peroxide-blonde Ellis, steely and needy, implying an impassive and obsessive nature alongside moments of maternal behaviour."  Richard Bratby of The Arts Desk also praised the work, opining:
He added, "Simply staged by director Richard Williams with minimal lighting and back-projected captions, and eloquently conducted by Vass, Entanglement created characters that live with you after the drama has ended: a sure-fire sign that it needs to be seen again, and soon."

However, Richard Morrison of The Times was more critical of the work, remarking, "With lurid subjects ripped from the tabloid headlines of 60 years ago, this new operatic double bill at the Cheltenham Festival should have been more gripping than it was."

References

Operas by Charlotte Bray
2015 operas
Operas set in England
One-act operas
Operas based on actual events
Operas based on real people
Operas set in the 20th century
Cultural depictions of Ruth Ellis